EORI may refer to:

Eori, an island of Fiji
EORI number, an EU identification number for the import or export of goods